The Child Cancer Foundation is a New Zealand-based charity that offers support to children with cancer and their families.

It has a high profile through public fundraising events.

As of 2011, it had an income of NZ$ 4.8 million, of which NZ$1.9 million was fundraising income, with most of the rest being from donations and bequests.

References

External links

 

Cancer organizations
Children's charities based in New Zealand
Medical and health organisations based in New Zealand
Pediatric cancers
Pediatric organizations